The 1958–59 Northern Football League season was the 61st in the history of the Northern Football League, a football competition in Northern England.

Clubs

The league featured 14 clubs which competed in the last season, along with one new club, joined from the North Eastern League:
 Whitley Bay

League table

References

1958-59
5